This List of leading goalscorers for the Nigeria national football team contains football players who have played for the Nigeria national team and is listed according to their number of goals scored. The Nigeria national football team  represents the nation of Nigeria in international football. It is fielded by the Nigeria Football Federation and competes as a member of Confederation of African Football.

Players
 Goals and appearances are composed of FIFA World Cup and Africa Cup of Nations matches, as well as numerous international friendly tournaments and matches. Players marked in bold are still active and eligible (meaning they have not retired) to play for the national team.

Statistics correct as of the Africa Cup of Nations qualifier against Sao Tome and Principe on 13 June 2022
Position key:
GK – Goalkeeper;
DF – Defender;
MF – Midfielder;
FW – Forward

References